The Reuben and Edith Hecht Museum is a museum located on the grounds of the University of Haifa, Israel.

History

The Hecht Museum was established in 1984 by Reuben Hecht, director of Dagon Silos  and a founding member of the University of Haifa Board of Governors. For sixty years, Hecht collected  archaeological artefacts representing the material culture of the Land of Israel in ancient times. He was particularly interested in finds from the Canaanite period to the end of the Byzantine period.  Hecht believed that archeology was an important expression of Zionism and these ancient artifacts were proof of the link between the Jewish people and Eretz Israel.

Exhibits
Exhibits display the archaeology and history of the Land of Israel in chronological sequence, from  the Chalcolithic period to the Byzantine period. Exhibits include coins, weights, Semitic seals, jewelry, artifacts from the Temple Mount excavations; Phoenician metalworking, woodworking, stone vessels, glass making, and mosaics. The museum is also home to the Ma'agan Michael Ship, the wreck of a fifth-century BCE merchantman. The museum art collection includes French painting of the Barbizon School, Impressionism, Post-impressionism, and the School of Paris, and Jewish art from mid-nineteenth to early twentieth century. The museum owns paintings by Jean-Baptiste-Camille Corot, Édouard Manet, Claude Monet, Camille Jacob Pissarro, Vincent van Gogh, Amedeo Modigliani, Max Liebermann.

Activities
The museum has an acoustic auditorium that seats 380  and a pipe organ, built by Gideon Shamir from parts of organs used in churches throughout the country over a century ago. It also serves as a study center for students and academic researchers, offering enrichment studies in archaeology, art, Bible, and history for schoolchildren, soldiers, teachers and the public at large.

The Museum holds an annual art competition open to high-school students, soldiers, and fine arts students. Winners of the competition are granted scholarships by the Hecht Foundation, which also awards fellowships to M.A. and Ph.D. students in the Departments of Archeology and Maritime Civilizations. The Museum holds conferences, symposia, seminars, and lectures and publishes catalogs of its exhibitions of archeology and art.

Journal
Michmanim, the museum journal, publishes scholarly articles on archaeological research and artifacts in the museum collection.

See also
List of Israeli museums
Visual arts in Israel

References

External links 

 The Hecht Museum
 University of Haifa

Archaeological museums in Israel
Museums in Haifa
History museums in Israel
Museums established in 1984
University museums in Israel
University of Haifa
Museums of Ancient Near East in Israel
1984 establishments in Israel